GWR No. 1340 is an 0-4-0ST steam locomotive, built in 1897 (Works No. 1386) by the Avonside Engine Company of Bristol, England.

Its first owners were Messrs Dunn & Shute of Newport Town Dock. In 1903 it was purchased by the Alexandra Docks Railway. This was absorbed into the Great Western Railway in 1923.

In July 1932, the GWR sold it to the Netherseal colliery, Burton-on-Trent. It changed hands again in 1947, going to Alders (Tamworth) Ltd.

Service Life
Trojan was built by Avonside in 1897 for Messrs Dunn & Shute of Newport Town. In 1903 it was sold to the Alexandra Docks Railway in 1903, though was still unnumbered. Upon the absorption of the ADR in 1923 into the GWR, it gained the number 1340. The locomotive flowed around Great Western, though often found its way to Cardiff Cathys and Radyr, however was also found at Oswestry and Greenford. The Great Western withdrew it from Cardiff in July 1932, and sold it Nethersal Colliery at Burton-on-Trent. In 1947 it was passed onto Alders (Tamworth) ltd.

Preservation
Trojan is now preserved at the Didcot Railway Centre. It was restored to working order in 2002 and remained in service on demonstration trains at Didcot until 2011 when it was withdrawn for a ten-yearly overhaul. Trojan was moved offsite in 2016 for the overhaul to take place, and returned in 2021.

Models
Agenoria Models produces a brass etch kit for both 4 mm and 7 mm scales.
BRLoco Models producing a plastic kit for both 0 gauge scale and 3.5 inch scales.

See also 
 GWR 0-4-0ST

Sources
 Didcot Railway Centre

References

0-4-0ST locomotives
1340
Avonside locomotives
Standard gauge steam locomotives of Great Britain